The Harvard Crimson football program represents Harvard University in college football at the NCAA Division I Football Championship Subdivision (formerly Division I-AA). Harvard's football program is one of the oldest in the world, having begun competing in the sport in 1873. The Crimson has a legacy that includes 13 national championships and 20 College Football Hall of Fame inductees, including the first African-American college football player William H. Lewis, Huntington "Tack" Hardwick, Barry Wood, Percy Haughton, and Eddie Mahan. Harvard is the eighth winningest team in NCAA Division I football history.

The Crimson play their home games at Harvard Stadium in Boston, Massachusetts.

History

Early history
Though rugby style "carrying game" with use of hands permitted (as opposed to "kicking games" where hands were not permitted) between Freshmen and Sophomores were played in 1858 the rugby team was not founded until December 6, 1872, by former members of the Oneida Football Club, formed in 1862 and considered by some historians as the first formal "football" club in the United States. Oneida had developed the "Boston Rules", an early code of football that was also used by the recently established Harvard club.

Harvard team is the oldest Rugby team in the United States. 

Old "Football Fightum" had been resurrected at Harvard in 1872, when Harvard resumed playing football. Harvard, however, had adopted a version of football which allowed carrying, albeit only when the player carrying the ball was being pursued. As a result of this, Harvard refused to attend the rules conference organized by the other schools and continued to play under its own code. 

In 1873 when the Harvard team received an invitation from the McGill University football club. The McGill team was then in a similar situation as Harvard, as they sought some team with which to play rugby football and no other club wanted to play that game. Harvard boys agreed to a rugby match with McGill under the condition the Canadians played the Boston Game. As McGill accepted, a two-game series was scheduled for May 1874 in Boston. The team captains sent letters detailing their respective game's rules and it was agreed that the first game would be played under Boston rules and the second under rugby rules. Inasmuch as rugby football had been transplanted to Canada from England, the McGill team played under a set of rules which allowed a player to pick up the ball and run with it whenever he wished. Another rule, unique to McGill, was to count tries (the act of grounding the football past the opposing team's goal line; it is important to note that there was no end zone during this time), as well as goals, in the scoring. In the Rugby rules of the time, a touchdown only provided the chance to kick a free goal from the field. If the kick was missed, the touchdown did not count.

The first game (attended by nearly 500 spectators, mostly students) showed the kicking of a round ball as the most prominent feature of the "Boston Game". The Canadians were easily defeated by a Harvard squad familiarised with the Boston rules in contrast to the lack of experience of McGill players. During the second game under the rugby rules, the Harvard players easily adapted to the less restrictive rules of the game, such as the unlimited running and passing the ball or the more aggressive and constant tackling. Within a few years, Harvard had both adopted McGill's rules and persuaded other U.S. university teams to do the same. On June 4, 1875, Harvard played another rugby match v Tufts University (lost 1–0), and then Yale on November 13. That game caused Yale dropped the association football in favour of rugby.

In the forty-year period from 1889 to 1928, Harvard had more than 80 first-team All-American selections. Under head coach Percy Haughton, Harvard had three consecutive undefeated seasons from 1912 to 1914, including two perfect seasons in 1912 and 1913.

The McGill team traveled to Cambridge to meet Harvard. On May 14, 1874, the first game, played under Harvard's rules, was won by Harvard with a score of 3–0. The next day, the two teams played under "McGill" rugby rules to a scoreless tie. The games featured a round ball instead of a rugby-style oblong ball. This series of games represents an important milestone in the development of the modern game of American football. In October 1874, the Harvard team once again traveled to Montreal to play McGill in rugby, where they won by three tries.  Harvard later brought the Harvard/McGill rules to a game against another American college.  On June 4, 1875, Harvard played Tufts University under rules that included each side fielding 11 men, the ball was advanced by kicking or carrying it, and tackles of the ball carrier stopped play.  This is likely the first game between two American colleges in this early era that most resembled the modern game of American football.

The Harvard Crimson was one of the dominant forces in the early days of intercollegiate football, winning 9 college football national championships between 1890 and 1919.  

In both 1919 and 1920, headed by All-American brothers Arnold Horween and Ralph Horween (who also attended Harvard Law School), Harvard was undefeated (9–0–1, as they outscored their competition 229–19, and 8–0–1, respectively).  The team won the 1920 Rose Bowl against the University of Oregon, 7–6. It was the only bowl appearance in Harvard history.

NCAA Division I subdivision split
The NCAA decided to split Division I into two subdivisions in 1978, then called I-A for larger schools, and I-AA for the smaller ones.  The NCAA had devised the split, in part, with the Ivy League in mind, but the conference did not move down for four seasons despite the fact that there were many indications that the ancient eight were on the wrong side of an increasing disparity between the big and small schools.  In 1982, the NCAA created a rule that stated a program's average attendance must be at least 15,000 to qualify for I-A membership.  This forced the conference's hand, as only some of the member schools met the attendance qualification.  Choosing to stay together rather than stand their ground separately in the increasingly competitive I-A subdivision, the Ivy League, along with several other conferences and independent programs moved down into I-AA starting with the 1982 season (a number of these teams have since returned to I-A/FBS).

Recent history

Since the formation of the Ivy League in 1956, Harvard has won outright or shared 17 Ivy League championships (8 outright; 9 shared), 1961 (6–3), 1966 (8–1), 1968 (8–0–1), 1974 (7–2), 1975 (7–2), 1982 (7–3), 1983 (6–2–2), 1987 (8–2), 1997 (9–1), 2001 (9–0), 2004 (10–0), 2007 (8–2), 2008 (9–1), 2011 (9–1), 2013 (9–1), 2014 (10–0) and 2015 (9–1). The Crimson are behind Penn and Dartmouth's 18 Ivy League Football Championships.

In summer 2020, the Ivy League announced that the fall season would be postponed or even cancelled because of the COVID-19 pandemic. Play did not resume until September 2021, after a nearly two-year hiatus, with a 44-9 victory over Georgetown.

Championships

National championships
Harvard has won 12 national championships (1874, 1875, 1890, 1898, 1899, 1901, 1908, 1910, 1912, 1913, 1919, 1920) from NCAA-designated major selectors. Harvard claims seven of these college football national championships.

Bold indicates claimed championship

Conference championships
Harvard has won 17 conference championships, all of which occurring during their tenure in the Ivy League, which they joined in 1956, with eight of them being outright and nine being shared. They are second in total Ivy League football titles, behind Dartmouth and Penn.

† Co-championship

Head coaches

In over a century of play, Harvard has had numerous head coaches, with varying success.

Rivalries

Yale

Harvard and Yale have been competing against each other in football since 1875.  The annual rivalry game between the two schools, known as "The Game", is played in November at the end of the football season. As of 2015, Yale led the series 65–59–8.  The Game is the second oldest continuing rivalry and also the third most-played rivalry game in college football history, after the Lehigh–Lafayette Rivalry (1884) and the Princeton–Yale game (1873).  Sports Illustrated On Campus rated the Harvard–Yale rivalry the sixth-best in college athletics in 2003. Ted Kennedy played football for Harvard and caught a touchdown pass in the 1955 Harvard/Yale game.  In 2006, Yale ended a five-game losing streak against Harvard, winning 34–13. The star of the game was freshman QB Derrick Szu-tu. Despite never playing high school football, the frosh went 27-for-35 for 359 yards and six passing touchdowns (along with 6 interceptions and 4 lost fumbles).  That Harvard winning streak was third longest in the history of the series, after Yale's 1902–1907 six-game winning streak and Yale's 1880–1889 eight-game winning streak.  Harvard has since beaten Yale in 2007, 2008, 2009, 2010, 2011, 2012, 2013, 2014 and 2015.  The Game is significant for historical reasons as the rules of The Game soon were adopted by other schools.  Football's rules, conventions, and equipment, as well as elements of "atmosphere" such as the mascot and fight song, include many elements pioneered or nurtured at Harvard and Yale.

Dartmouth

The series with Dartmouth dates to 1882.

Penn

The series with Penn dates to 1881.

Princeton

The series with Princeton dates to 1877.

Stadiums

Early stadiums
In its early years, the football team played at several stadiums including Jarvis Field, Holmes Field and Soldier's Field.

Harvard Stadium

Harvard Stadium is a horseshoe-shaped football stadium in the Allston neighborhood of Boston, Massachusetts, in the United States. The stadium is an important historic landmark.  Built in 1903, it is the nation's oldest stadium. Penn's Franklin Field is the oldest site still in use (1895) but its current stadium was built in 1922.  It was also the world's first massive reinforced-concrete structure, and considered at the time of construction to be the 'finest structure of its kind in the world'.  The structure was completed in just six months, mainly by the efforts of Harvard students, and for a budget of $200,000.  Thus 'the stadium represents the thought, the money, the ideas, the planning, and the manual labor of Harvard men'.  As such, it is one of four athletic arenas distinguished as a National Historic Landmark (the Los Angeles Memorial Coliseum, Rose Bowl and the Yale Bowl are the other three).  The stadium seats 30,323. Temporary steel stands were added in the stadiums to expand capacity to 57,166 until 1951.  Afterward, there were smaller temporary stands until the building of the Murr Center (which is topped by the new scoreboard) in 1998.  In 2006, Harvard installed both FieldTurf and lights.

College Football Hall of Fame inductees
As of 2018, 18 Harvard Crimson football players and 3 coaches have been inducted into the College Football Hall of Fame.

Harvard players in the NFL

Over 30 players from Harvard have gone on to play in the National Football League.

All-Americans

Since the first All-American team was selected by Caspar Whitney in 1889, more than 100 Harvard football players have been selected as first-team All-Americans.  Consensus All-Americans are noted below with bold typeface.

1889: Arthur Cumnock (End), John Cranston (G), James P. Lee (HB)
1890: Frank Hallowell (End), Marshall Newell (T), John Cranston (C), Dudley Dean (QB), John Corbett (HB)
1891: Marshall Newell (T), Everett J. Lake (HB)
1892: Frank Hallowell (End), Marshall Newell (T), Bert Waters (G), William H. Lewis (center), Charley Brewer (FB)
1893: Marshall Newell (T), William H. Lewis (C), Charley Brewer (FB)
1894: Bert Waters (T), Mackie (G),  Bob Wrenn (QB)
1895: Norman Cabot (End), Charley Brewer (FB)
1896: Norman Cabot (End), Percy Haughton (T), N. Shaw (G), Edgar Wrightington (HB), Dunlop (Harvard)
1897: Moulton (End), George W. Bouve (G), Allan Doucette (C), Benjamin Dibblee (FB)
1898: John Hallowell (End), Cochran (End), Percy Haughton (T), Walter Boal (G), Charles Dudley Daly (QB), Benjamin Dibblee (HB), Warren (HB), Reid (FB)
1899: Dave Campbell (End), Donald (T), Charles Dudley Daly (QB), Sarwin (HB)
1900: John Hallowell (End), Dave Campbell (End), Charles Dudley Daly (QB), Sarwin (HB)
1901: Edward Bowditch (End), Dave Campbell (End), Oliver Cutts (T), Crawford Blagden (T), William Lee (G), Charles A. Barnard (G), Sargeant (C), Robert Kernan (HB), Thomas Graydon (FB)
1902:  Edward Bowditch (End), Thomas Graydon (FB)
1903: Edward Bowditch (End), Daniel Knowlton (T), Andrew Marshall (G), Henry Schoellkopf (FB)
1904: Daniel Hurley (HB)
1905: Karl Brill (T), Beaton Squires (T), Francis Burr (G), Daniel Hurley (HB)
1906: Charles Osborne (T), Francis Burr (G), Harry Kersberg (G), Bartol Parker (C), Jack Wendell (FB)
1907: Patrick Grant (C), Jack Wendell (HB)
1908: Gilbert Goodwin Browne (End), Hamilton Fish III (T), Robert McKay (T), Sam Hoar (G), Hamilton Corbett (HB), Charles Nourse (C), Johnny Cutler (QB), Ernest Ver Wiebe (HB), 
1909: Hamilton Corbett (HB), Hamilton Fish III (T), Wayland Minot (HB)
1910: Hamilton Corbett (HB), L.D. Smith (End), Lewis (End), Robert McKay (T), Ted Withington (T), Bob Fisher (G), Wayland Minot (G), Percy Wendell (HB)
1911:  Smith (End), Bob Fisher (G), Percy Wendell (HB)
1912: Sam Felton (End), Bob Storer (T), Stan Pennock (G), Gardner (QB), Charles Brickley (HB), Percy Wendell (FB), Huntington "Tack" Hardwick (FB)
1913: O'Brien (End), Harvey Rexford Hitchcock, Jr. (T), Robert Treat Paine Storer (T), Stan Pennock (G), Eddie Mahan (HB), Charles Brickley (FB)
1914: Huntington Hardwick (End),  Walter Trumbull (T), Stan Pennock (G), Eddie Mahan (HB), Frederick Bradlee (HB)
1915: Joseph Gilman (T), Richard King (HB), Eddie Mahan (FB)
1916: Richard Harte (End), Harrie Dadmun (G), Eddie Casey (HB)
1919: Bob Sedgwick (G), Eddie Casey (HB)
1920: Bob Sedgwick (T), Tom Woods (G), James Tolbert (G), Arnold Horween (FB)
1921: C.C. Macomber (End), John Brown (G), George Owen (HB)
1922: Charles Hubbard (G), Charles Buell (QB), George Owen (HB)
1923: Charles Hubbard (G)
1929: Ben Ticknor (C)
1930: Ben Ticknor (C)
1931: Irad Hardy (T), Barry Wood (QB)
1932: Irad Hardy (T)
1975 (Division I-AA) – Dan Jiggetts (OT)
1982 (Division I-AA) – Michael Corbat (OG)
2016 Ben Braunecker (TE)

Players notable in other fields
Below are any Crimson football players that became notable for reasons other than football. Included is notability, position at Harvard, and any accomplishments while playing.

 Tommy Lee Jones, actor, guard (1965–1968), 1st team All-Ivy League 1968
 Christopher Nowinski, former professional wrestler with WWE and current activist on concussions in sports; linebacker and defensive end (1996–1999); 2nd-team All-Ivy League 1999
 Michael O'Hare, actor, defensive tackle (1971–1974)

See also
List of NCAA football teams by wins

References

External links

 

 
American football teams established in 1873
1873 establishments in Massachusetts